Hypothyce is a genus of May beetles and junebugs in the family Scarabaeidae. There are at least three described species in Hypothyce.

Species
These three species belong to the genus Hypothyce:
 Hypothyce burnei Skelley, 2005
 Hypothyce mixta Howden, 1968
 Hypothyce osburni (Cartwright, 1967)

References

Further reading

 
 
 
 
 

Melolonthinae
Articles created by Qbugbot